The Campolongo Pass (1875 m) is a high mountain pass in the Dolomites in South Tyrol in Italy.

It connects Corvara in the Val Badia and Arabba.

The pass can be crossed in winter on skis.

Maratona dles Dolomites 
The Campolongo Pass is the first of seven Dolomites mountain passes riders cross in the annual Maratona dles Dolomites single-day bicycle race. The Campolongo is the only one of the seven passes to be ascended twice.

See also
 List of highest paved roads in Europe
 List of mountain passes

External links
CYCLEFILM's Video Reconnaissance of the Campolongo Pass (Part of Maratona dles Dolomites Guide DVD)

Mountain passes of South Tyrol
Campolongo